The Mauch Chunk Lake was originally built by a dam designed by the United States Army Corps of Engineers in early 1972.  Constructed as a 50-foot-high earthen dam 1,710 feet long and holds a 320-acre reservoir.  It was officially opened in the summer of 1974, at a cost of 3 million dollars, which would be 18 million in today's money.  It was commissioners Agnes T McCartney and Rep. Daniel Flood who oversaw the venture. Before this manmade lake was opened, the water that ran from the natural springs fed atop the Mauch Chunk Mountain was cause for alarm for the Mauch Chunk Creek. There were a number of floods throughout the years flooding upper and lower Broadway (the main street in Jim Thorpe).  Some of the worst floods occurred in 1861, 1901, 1902, and in 1969. One of the first tests of this dam was put to the test with Hurricane Agnes in 1972, as the dam held and many of the towns near that area got up to 18 inches of rain.

See also
List of lakes in Pennsylvania

References

Carbon County, Pennsylvania
Lakes of Pennsylvania